The manga series Medaka Box is written by Nisio Isin and illustrated by Akira Akatsuki. Medaka Box was published in Shueisha's Weekly Shōnen Jump magazine between May 11, 2009 and April 27, 2013. As of June 4, 2013, Shueisha has compiled its chapters into 22 bound volumes.



Volume list

References

Nisio Isin
Medaka Box